Ride is a 1989 album by British folk rock band Oysterband. The album features a cover of the New Order song "Love Vigilantes".

Critical reception

Martin Aston, reviewer of British music newspaper Music Week, called Oysterband "best band in Folk Roots last three polls" but complained that they lost a half of their roots here while making sound more modern.

Track listing

LP

Side 1 
 "New York Girls" (Traditional) - 3:02
 "Gamblers (We Do Not Do That Anymore)" (Ian Telfer / Alan Prosser)- 4:24
 "Take Me Down" (Telfer / Prosser / John Jones) - 3:50
 "Cheekbone City" (Telfer / Prosser) - 5:03
 "Love Vigilantes" (Stephen Morris / Peter Hook / Bernard Sumner / Gillian Gilbert)  - 3:58

Side 2 
 "Too Late Now" (Telfer / Prosser / Jones / Kearey) - 4:05
 "Polish Plain" (Telfer / Prosser) - 3:54
 "Heaven to Calcutta" (Telfer / Prosser / Jones) - 4:06
 "Tincans" (Telfer / Jones) - 3:30
 "This Year, Next Year" (Telfer) - 4:31

CD version 
 "New York Girls" - 3:02
 "Gamblers (We Do Not Do That Anymore)" - 4:24
 "Polish Plain" - 3:54
 "Too Late Now" - 4:05
 "Tincans" - 3:30
 "Heaven to Calcutta" - 4:06
 "This Year, Next Year" - 4:31
 "My Dog (Knows Where the Bones Are Hid)" (Telfer / Prosser / Jones) - 3:07
 "The Sins of the Family" (Telfer / Jones) - 4:24
 "Take Me Down" - 3:50
 "Cheekbone City" - 5:03
 "Love Vigilantes" - 3:58

Personnel
John Jones - Vocals, Melodeon 
Ian Telfer - Fiddle, Alto Saxophone, Organ 
Alan Prosser - Guitars, Vocals, Bones 
Russell Lax - Drums 
Chopper - Bass Guitar, Electric Cello, Vocals

Issues

LP 
Cooking Vinyl Records COOK 020 (Great Britain) 
Polydor 422 838 400-1 (USA) 
Mercury 838 400-1 (West Germany)

CD 
Cooking Vinyl Records COOKCD 020 (Great Britain) 
Polydor 422 838 400-2 (USA)

References

1989 albums
Oysterband albums